Asbury is a city in Dubuque County, Iowa, United States, and adjacent to the westside of the city of Dubuque. It is part of the Dubuque, Iowa Metropolitan Statistical Area. The population was 5,943 at the 2020 census. Asbury is the second-largest city in Dubuque County, surpassing Dyersville to become the second-largest in the 2010 U.S. Census count. The city is largely a bedroom community, made up of subdivisions whose residents work in Dubuque or Peosta.

History
Asbury was settled beginning in the 1830s, at first by Methodists. The city is named after British-born Bishop Francis Asbury, one of the first two bishops of the Methodist Episcopal Church in the United States. The city was incorporated in 1933, following the passage of the Twenty-first Amendment to the United States Constitution, which ended prohibition. The city incorporated to gain the legal standing necessary to sell alcohol, as liquor licenses were still forbidden in rural areas.

For most of its history, Asbury was very small, much like hundreds of other towns in rural Iowa. In the 1960 census, Asbury still had only 71 residents. During this time, the City of Dubuque grew immensely, and the sprawl reached the Asbury area beginning in the 1960s. By 1970, Asbury had 410 residents and had grown fast enough to become the fastest growing city in the state of Iowa.

Asbury continues to grow at a rapid pace today, expanding over 50% since the year 2000, and currently (2020) counts 5,943 residents. This number is increasing, as a number of new subdivisions are being built or planned for the area.

Law and government
Asbury has a mayor–council form of government, employing a full-time city administrator, and part-time city council (mayor and 5 at-large city council members). The city administrator is Beth Bonz, the current mayor is Jim Adams, and the council members are: Bob Reisch, Craig Miller, John Richey, Curt Kiessling and Larry Nagle. The city council meets at 7 P.M. on the second and fourth Tuesdays of every month at Asbury City Hall.

The city council works on the advice of a number of citizen committees, including the following: Building Code Commission, Park & Recreation Board, Planning & Zoning Commission, Zoning Board of Adjustment, and the Water Board. In addition, Asbury sends commissioners to the Eastern Iowa Housing Authority.

Asbury has 3 city departments: Public Safety (police & fire), Public Works, and Parks.

In the Iowa General Assembly, Asbury is represented by Senator Carrie Koelker (Republican), and Representative Shannon Lundgren (Republican) in the Iowa House of Representatives. At the federal level, it is within Iowa's 1st congressional district, represented by Ashley Hinson (R) in the U.S. House of Representatives. Asbury, and all of Iowa, are represented by U.S. Senators Chuck Grassley (R) and Joni Ernst (R).

Geography
Asbury is located at  (42.515648, -90.763235).

The city operates four parks and pedestrian and mountain bike trails. The parks include: Althaus Wetland & Nature Preserve, Asbury Park, Cloie Creek Park, and Maple Hills Park. The trail runs from Asbury Rd. to Maple Hills Park, and is part of Asbury's plan for having a citywide trail network.

Economy
Serving primarily as a bedroom community, Asbury has only a small local economy. Most of its residents commute to work in Dubuque. Only a handful of businesses operate within the City of Asbury, however, this number has grown in recent years, along with an expanding population. Most people who do work in Asbury either are employed by the city government, or in the service-related businesses along Asbury and Saratoga Roads.

Demographics

2010 census
As of the census of 2010, there were 4,170 people, 1,433 households, and 1,164 families residing in the city. The racial makeup of the city was 96.8% White, 1.0% African American, 1.1% Asian, 0.3% from other races, and 0.8% from two or more races. Hispanic or Latino of any race were 1.4% of the population.

There were 1,433 households, of which 45.4% had children under the age of 18 living with them, 71.5% were married couples living together, 7.0% had a female householder with no husband present, 2.8% had a male householder with no wife present, and 18.8% were non-families. 15.3% of all households were made up of individuals, and 5.7% had someone living alone who was 65 years of age or older. The average household size was 2.91 and the average family size was 3.27.

The median age in the city was 35.6 years. 32.9% of residents were under the age of 18; 6% were between the ages of 18 and 24; 26% were from 25 to 44; 25.4% were from 45 to 64; and 9.9% were 65 years of age or older. The gender makeup of the city was 49.2% male and 50.8% female.

2000 census
As of the census of 2000, there were 2,450 people, 846 households, and 728 families residing in the city. The racial makeup of the city was 98.49% White, 0.49% African American, 0.37% Asian, 0.04% Pacific Islander, 0.24% from other races, and 0.37% from two or more races. Hispanic or Latino of any race were 0.73% of the population.

There were 846 households, out of which 44.4% had children under the age of 18 living with them, 77.8% were married couples living together, 6.6% had a female householder with no husband present, and 13.9% were non-families. 11.0% of all households were made up of individuals, and 2.8% had someone living alone who was 65 years of age or older. The average household size was 2.90 and the average family size was 3.13.

30.7% are under the age of 18, 7.1% from 18 to 24, 27.7% from 25 to 44, 27.8% from 45 to 64, and 6.7% who were 65 years of age or older. The median age was 36 years. For every 100 females, there were 98.5 males. For every 100 females age 18 and over, there were 98.5 males.

The median income for a household in the city was $60,100, and the median income for a family was $64,097. Males had a median income of $41,935 versus $25,337 for females. The per capita income for the city was $21,447. About 4.5% of families and 4.0% of the population were below the poverty line, including 4.3% of those under age 18 and 7.9% of those age 65 or over.

Education
All students living in Asbury are zoned to schools in the Dubuque Community School District. Elementary school students living in the  central, eastern, and southern parts of Asbury are zoned to Carver Elementary School. Other students in northern, western, and southwestern Asbury (Arrowhead, Brook Haven, Forest Hills, Long Grove, Wedgewood) are zoned to Kennedy Elementary School. Asbury's middle school students are zoned to Roosevelt Middle School, and high school students are zoned to Hempstead High School.

There are no private schools currently operating in Asbury, but many parochial school students attend private schools in Dubuque, as they are open to anyone, regardless of location. Many of these students are enrolled in the Holy Family Catholic School System, and attend nearby Resurrection Elementary School, Mazzuchelli Middle School, and Wahlert High School. There is also a private elementary school serving the Lutheran community in the area, the Dubuque Lutheran School (LCMS affiliated).

Neighborhoods
Asbury is a city of neighborhoods. Since the city is very young, and much of its growth has occurred only recently, its subdivisions are still clearly identifiable. Generally, eastern and southern parts of the city are older, while northern and western areas are of entirely new construction. Asbury's "main street" is Asbury Road, and most of the neighborhoods branch off of this artery. The city is growing at a phenomenal clip, adding 544 new single-family homes since 2000.

References

External links
 Official City Website

Cities in Iowa
Cities in Dubuque County, Iowa
1933 establishments in Iowa